Moira may refer to:

Places

Australia
 Moira, New South Wales, an Australian rural community
 County of Moira, Victoria, Australia
 Division of Moira, Victoria, Australia, an Electoral Division
 Shire of Moira, a local government area in Victoria, Australia

Canada
 Moira, Ontario, an unincorporated area
 Moira Lake, Ontario
 Moira River, Ontario

United Kingdom
 Moira, County Down, a village in Northern Ireland
 Moira railway station
 Moira, Leicestershire, a village in England
 Moira Furnace, nineteenth century iron-making blast furnace

United States
 Moira, New York, a town
 Moira Sound, Alaska

Elsewhere
 Moira, Achaea, a village in Greece
 Moira, Goa, a village in India
 638 Moira, an asteroid

People
 Moira (given name), including a list of women and fictional characters
 Gerald Moira (1867–1959), English painter
Earl of Moira, extinct title in the peerage of Ireland

Arts, entertainment, and media
 Moira (album), a 2008 story album by the Japanese musical group Sound Horizon
 Moira (film), a 2015 Georgian film
Moira (Overwatch), a fictional character from the video game Overwatch
 Moira (Utrecht), a music and art venue in Utrecht, Netherlands
 Moira MacTaggert, a Marvel character associated with the X-Men

Ships
 HMS Moira (1805), a British Royal Navy schooner
 , a Greek coaster in service during 1966

Other
 Moira (military), a Greek military formation
 Moira, a genus of prehistoric echinoderms
 Moira, the singular of Moirai (Fates), Greek deities, incarnations of destiny
 Earl of Moira, a title in the Peerage of Ireland, derived from the village of Moira, County Down
 Moira (horse), a Canadian-bred Thoroughbred racehorse

See also
 Moire (disambiguation)
Morea (disambiguation)
Moria (disambiguation)
Morya (disambiguation)